Suneet  (Devanagari: सुनीत) also written as Sunit, is an Indian masculine given name. It is a Sanskrit masculine word which means 'he who has good conducts/ethics' or 'he who is well mannered'.

Suneet Chopra, Indian politician
Suneet Maheshwari, entrepreneur
Suneet Singh Tuli, entrepreneur
Suneet Varma , Indian fashion designer

Hindu given names
Indian masculine given names